Bryan de Jesús (born 10 February 1995) is an Ecuadorian professional footballer who plays for C.D. Olmedo on loan from Universidad Católica. Bryan de Jesús is the brother of Marlon de Jesús who plays for CS Emelec.

Club statistics

Updated to games played as of 15 December 2018.

References

1995 births
Living people
People from Ibarra, Ecuador
Ecuadorian footballers
Association football forwards
C.D. El Nacional footballers
Club Necaxa footballers
Puskás Akadémia FC players
Guayaquil City F.C. footballers
Mushuc Runa S.C. footballers
C.D. Universidad Católica del Ecuador footballers
L.D.U. Quito footballers
Ecuadorian Serie A players
Liga MX players
Nemzeti Bajnokság I players
Ecuadorian expatriate footballers
Ecuadorian expatriate sportspeople in Mexico
Expatriate footballers in Mexico
Ecuadorian expatriate sportspeople in Hungary
Expatriate footballers in Hungary